Colubraria testacea is a species of sea snail, a marine gastropod mollusk in the family Colubrariidae.

Description

Distribution

References

Colubrariidae